This is a list of Governor of Jubaland, a federated state that is part of the Federal Republic of Somalia. The Governor state of Jubaland is an executive head of state: the Governor functions as the head of state, and is elected by Jubaland legislature to serve an indeterminate term.

Prior to achieving independence in 1960, the elected head of Jubaland in the form of a province and the time period was as follows.

List

President of Jubaland Somalia 
List of presidents of Somaliland
List of presidents of Puntland
Lists of office-holders

References

External links
World Statesmen – Somalia (Jubaland)

Jubaland
Somalia history-related lists
Government of Somalia